M. profunda may refer to:
 Marsupella profunda, the Western rustwort, a liverwort species endemic to Europe
 Murexsul profunda, a sea snail species

See also 
 Profunda (disambiguation)